Rudram is a Marathi thriller television series was directed by Bhimrao Mude, written by Girish Joshi and produced by Nikhil Sheth, Vinod Lavekar, Sandesh Kulkarni under the production house Potadi Entertainment. The series starred Mukta Barve, Vandana Gupte, Satish Rajwade, Mohan Agashe among others and debuted on Zee Yuva on 7 August 2017. The final episode was broadcast on 16 November 2017.

Plot
Ragini (Mukta Barve) is an ordinary young woman living an ordinary life. Her life is turned up side down when her husband, only child and her father are killed in a car accident, but luckily she survives. Dealing with the following guilt and mental trauma, with the help of her physciatrist (Mohan Agashe) and accompanied by her mother (Vandana Gupte) she discovers that the accident was a premediated murder. This sets her on a journey of investigation and revenge, while struggling with personal and emotional challenges.

Cast
Mukta Barve as Ragini Desai
Vandana Gupte as Ragini's mother
Kiran Karmarkar as Makheeja
Anand Alkunte as Inspector Sadanand Dhurat 
Satish Rajwade
Mohan Agashe
Sandeep Pathak
Aniruddha Joshi
Suhas Palshikar
Vivek Lagoo
Suhas Shirsat
Mitali Jagtap
Sai Ranade
Milind Phatak
Sunil Abhyankar
Kiran Khoje
Ashish Kulkarni
Prathmesh Gurav

Graphics series on social media
To help viewers keep up with the progress of the series, a weekly graphic series was published by Zee Yuva's digital team on their social media channels (Facebook and Instagram).

References

External links 
 
 

2017 Indian television series debuts
2017 Indian television series endings
Marathi-language television shows
Zee Yuva original programming